"Only the Horses" is a song by American band Scissor Sisters. The track is the first single from their fourth studio album, Magic Hour. It premiered on April 6, 2012 on BBC Radio 1, and was released to various iTunes Stores as a single on April 13, 2012 in Europe and was released on May 13, 2012 in the United Kingdom.

Scissor Sisters worked with producers Boys Noize and Calvin Harris on the track, after having met Harris while working with Kylie Minogue on her eleventh studio album, Aphrodite.

Music video
Directed by Lorenzo Fonda and produced by Ross Levine, the music video for "Only the Horses" was released on April 19, 2012, and features a quartet of horses running through the desert in slow motion. Attached to the horses are long hempen ropes, and over the course of the video it becomes clear that the other ends of the ropes are attached to metal plates set in a decorated triangular panel. As the ropes run out of slack, the equestrian imagery is intercut with slow-motion reversed footage of paint cascading over people (the band members, with Jake Shears covered in pink, Del Marquis in yellow, BabyDaddy in green and Ana Matronic in blue, also revealed to be wearing a Scissor Sisters ring). At the end of the video (quite evidently a homage to John Huston's, The Misfits), the taut ropes pull the plates from the panel and fountains of paint shoot out.

Critical reception
Lewis Corner of Digital Spy blog gave the song a positive review stating:

"Only the horses can find us tonight/ Only the horses can bring us back home," Jake Shears belts over Calvin's usual mix of gleeful synths and fluorescent beats, though still retaining much of the band's camp and carefree vibrancy from when we first fell in love with them. The result is much like the song's interesting choice of a saviour; a number that canters along powerfully enough to last the distance. .

Track listing

Charts

Weekly charts

Year-end charts

Certifications

Release history

References

2012 singles
Scissor Sisters songs
2011 songs
Songs written by Amanda Ghost
Songs written by Jake Shears
Songs written by Babydaddy
Casablanca Records singles